Quiterianópolis is a municipality in southwestern portion of the state of Ceará near the western border in the Northeast region of Brazil. Its 2020 population (IBGE) was 21,166 inhabitants. Latitude: -5°50'32.99", Longitude: -40°42'0.78".  The nearest significant city is Crateús, 75 km to the north.

See also
List of municipalities in Ceará

References

Municipalities in Ceará